Fumaria (fumitory or fumewort, from Latin , "smoke of the earth") is a genus of about 60 species of annual flowering plants in the family Papaveraceae. The genus is native to Europe, Africa and Asia, most diverse in the Mediterranean region, and introduced to North, South America and Australia. Fumaria species are sometimes used in herbal medicine. Fumaria indica contains the alkaloids fuyuziphine and alpha-hydrastine.  Fumaria indica may have anti-inflammatory and analgesic potential.

Selected species
There are about 50 species:

Fumaria abyssinica Hammar
Fumaria agraria Lag.
Fumaria ajmasiana Pau & Font Quer
Fumaria asepala Boiss.
Fumaria atlantica Coss. & Durieu ex Hausskn.
Fumaria ballii Pugsley
Fumaria barnolae Sennen & Pau
Fumaria bastardii Boreau
Fumaria berberica Pugsley
Fumaria bicolor Sommier ex Nicotra
Fumaria bracteosa Pomel
Fumaria × burnatii Verg.
Fumaria capitata Lidén
Fumaria capreolata L.
Fumaria coccinea R.T.Lowe ex Pugsley
Fumaria daghestanica Michajlova
Fumaria densiflora DC.
Fumaria dubia Pugsley
Fumaria erostrata (Pugsley) Lidén
Fumaria faurei (Pugsley) M.Linden
Fumaria flabellata Gasp.
Fumaria × gagrica Michajlova
Fumaria gaillardotii Boiss.
Fumaria indica (Hausskn.) Pugsley
Fumaria judaica Boiss.
Fumaria kralikii Jord.
Fumaria macrocarpa Parl.
Fumaria macrosepala Boiss.
Fumaria mairei Pugsley ex Maire
Fumaria maurorum Maire
Fumaria melillaica Pugsley
Fumaria microstachys Kralik ex Hausskn.
Fumaria mirabilis Pugsley
Fumaria montana J.A.Schmidt
Fumaria munbyi Boiss. & Reut.
Fumaria muralis Sond. ex W.D.J.Koch
Fumaria normanii Pugsley
Fumaria occidentalis Pugsley
Fumaria officinalis L.
Fumaria ouezzanensis Pugsley
Fumaria parviflora Lam.
Fumaria petteri Rchb.
Fumaria platycarpa Lidén
Fumaria pugsleyana (Pugsley) Lidén
Fumaria purpurea Pugsley
Fumaria ragusina (Pugsley) Pugsley
Fumaria reuteri Boiss.
Fumaria rifana Lidén
Fumaria rostellata Knaf
Fumaria rupestris Boiss. & Reut.
Fumaria schleicheri Soy.-Will.
Fumaria schrammii Velen.
Fumaria segetalis (Hammar) Cout.
Fumaria sepium Boiss. & Reut.
Fumaria skottsbergii Lidén
Fumaria vaillantii Loisel.

References

 
Papaveraceae genera